Jovi may refer to:

Jovi-ye Majid, Iranian village
Jovi (musician), Cameroonian rapper
Fukushima Central Television, a television station from Japan (call sign JOVI-DTV)

See also

 
 Jovie Espenido (born 1968), Filipino police officer
 Bon Jovi (disambiguation)